Sergei Katsiev (born 1957/1958) is a Russian billionaire and retail businessman.

Early life 
Katsiev was born and raised in Moscow. He earned a bachelor's degree from the  Moscow Institute of International Relations.

Career 
After the fall of Soviet Union, he worked in a government trade mission to the Netherlands. When he returned to Russia, he headed Mercury Tobacco Corporation, a company owned by Igor Kesaev. In 1998, he founded his own company, Megapolis. In 2006, these two companies merged, and Megapolis is now the largest tobacco retailer in Russia.

Net worth 
As of August 2022, Katsiev is worth US$1.2 billion. He was ranked #1833 on the Forbes 2021 list of world billionaires.

Personal life 
Katsiev is married, has two children, and lives in Moscow.

References 

Businesspeople from Moscow
Russian billionaires
1950s births
Living people
Russian businesspeople in retailing